NGC 1325 is a flocculent spiral galaxy situated in the constellation of Eridanus. Located about 75 million light years away, it is a member of the Eridanus cluster of galaxies, a cluster of about 200 galaxies. It was discovered by William Herschel on 19 December 1799.

NGC 1325 has a Hubble classification of SBbc, which indicates it is a barred spiral galaxy with moderately wound arms. Its angular size on the night sky is 4.5' x 1.7'. The disk of the galaxy is inclined at an angle of 71° with the main axis aligned along a position angle of 232°. The rotation curve for the galaxy is flat across much of the radius from the core. The galaxy is moving away from the Milky Way with a heliocentric radial velocity of 1,588 km/s.

A supernova was discovered in this galaxy on December 30, 1975 by Justus Dunlap and Y. Dunlap at Corralitos Observatory. The color of this supernova and the rapid decline of the lightcurve suggest it was a type II supernova.

A core-collapse supernova designated SN 2021yja was detected in this galaxy on September 8, 2021. It was initially categorized as a type II, but may instead be a type Ic.

References

External links 
 

Eridanus (constellation)
Barred spiral galaxies
1325
012737